Cor triatriatum (or triatrial heart) is a congenital heart defect where the left atrium (cor triatriatum sinistrum) or right atrium (cor triatriatum dextrum) is subdivided by a thin membrane, resulting in three atrial chambers (hence the name).

Cor triatriatum represents 0.1% of all congenital cardiac malformations and may be associated with other cardiac defects in as many as 50% of cases.  The membrane may be complete or may contain one or more fenestrations of varying size.

Cor triatrium sinistrum is more common. In this defect there is typically a proximal chamber that receives the pulmonic veins and a distal (true) chamber located more anteriorly where it empties into the mitral valve.  The membrane that separates the atrium into two parts varies significantly in size and shape. It may appear similar to a diaphragm or be funnel-shaped, bandlike, entirely intact (imperforate) or contain one or more openings (fenestrations) ranging from small, restrictive-type to large and widely open.

In the pediatric population, this anomaly may be associated with major congenital cardiac lesions such as tetralogy of Fallot, double outlet right ventricle, coarctation of the aorta, partial anomalous pulmonary venous connection, persistent left superior vena cava with unroofed coronary sinus, ventricular septal defect, atrioventricular septal (endocardial cushion) defect, and common atrioventricular canal. Rarely, asplenia or polysplenia has been reported in these patients. In the adult, cor triatriatum is frequently an isolated finding.

Cause
Cor triatriatum dextrum is extremely rare and results from the complete persistence of the right sinus valve of the embryonic heart. The membrane divides the right atrium into a proximal (upper) and a distal (lower) chamber. The upper chamber receives the venous blood from both vena cavae and the lower chamber is in contact with the tricuspid valve and the right atrial appendage.

Mechanism
The natural history of this defect depends on the size of the communicating orifice between the upper and lower atrial chambers. If the communicating orifice is small, the patient is critically ill and may succumb at a young age (usually during infancy) to congestive heart failure and pulmonary edema. If the connection is larger, patients may present in childhood or young adulthood with a clinical picture similar to that of mitral stenosis. Cor triatriatum may also be an incidental finding when it is nonobstructive.

Diagnosis
Primarily diagnosed with imaging, such as echocardiogram (ultrasound of the heart), CT, and/or MRI.

Treatment
The disorder can be treated surgically by removing the membrane dividing the atrium.

References

Church WS. Congenital malformation of heart: abnormal septum in left auricle. Trans Path Soz. 1868;19:188-190.

Griffith TW. Note on a Second Example of Division of the Cavity of the Left Auricle into Two Compartments by a Fibrous Band. J Anat Physiol. Apr 1903;37:255-7. [Medline].

Anderson RH. Understanding the nature of congenital division of the atrial chambers. Br Heart J. Jul 1992;68(1):1-3. [Medline].

Richardson JV, Doty DB, Siewers RD, et al. Cor triatriatum (subdivided left atrium). J Thorac Cardiovasc Surg. Feb 1981;81(2):232-8. [Medline].

Trento A, Zuberbuhler JR, Anderson RH, et al. Divided right atrium (prominence of the eustachian and thebesian valves). J Thorac Cardiovasc Surg. Sep 1988;96(3):457-63. [Medline].

Marin-Garcia J, Tandon R, Lucas RV Jr, et al. Cor triatriatum: study of 20 cases. Am J Cardiol. Jan 1975;35(1):59-66. [Medline].

Niwayama G. Cor triatriatum. Am Heart J. Feb 1960;59:291-317. [Medline].

Jennings RB Jr, Innes BJ. Subtotal cor triatriatum with left partial anomalous pulmonary venous return. Successful surgical repair in an infant. J Thorac Cardiovasc Surg. Sep 1977;74(3):461-6. [Medline].

Tuccillo B, Stümper O, Hess J, et al. Transoesophageal echocardiographic evaluation of atrial morphology in children with congenital heart disease. Eur Heart J. Feb 1992;13(2):223-31. [Medline].

Wolf WJ. Diagnostic features and pitfalls in the two-dimensional echocardiographic evaluation of a child with cor triatriatum. Pediatr Cardiol. 1986;6(4):211-3. [Medline].

Beller B, Childers R, Eckner F, et al. Cor triatriatum in the adult. Complicated by mitral insufficiency and aortic dissection. Am J Cardiol. May 1967;19(5):749-54. [Medline].

External links 
 long description at emedicine

Congenital heart defects
Cardiology